Commercial bandwidth is a term for the regular capacity of the telephone network required for intelligible speech. It was defined as 300 to 3,400 hertz, although the modern PSTN is theoretically capable of transmitting from 0 to 7,000 Hz using ISDN.

See also
DS0
Bandwidth (signal processing)
Voice frequency

References

Telephony